"There Goes My Heart" is a song written by Raul Malo and Kostas, and recorded by American country music group The Mavericks.  It was released in October 1994 as the third single from the album What a Crying Shame.  The song reached number 20 on the Billboard Hot Country Singles & Tracks chart.

Music video
The music video was directed by Michael McNamara, and premiered in late 1994.

Chart performance

References

1994 singles
1994 songs
The Mavericks songs
Songs written by Kostas (songwriter)
Song recordings produced by Don Cook
Songs written by Raul Malo
MCA Records singles